Senda '91 is a live album by the Spanish rock band Héroes del Silencio. It was released after the "Tour Senda" tour, which highlighted music from their new album Senderos de Traición, songs from El Mar no Cesa, as well as new songs that wouldn't be released until their 1998 album Rarezas. The tour would last until October 1992 and would take a hiatus. The songs were recorded at a concert in Madrid, Spain.

Track listing
"Hace tiempo" - 4:47
"Maldito duende" - 5:05
"Decadencia" - 8:02
"Con nombre de guerra" - 4:20
"Oración" - 4:10
"El mar no cesa" - 3:10
"El cuadro III" - 2:53
"Hologramas" - 2:29

External links
 Héroes del Silencio official site

Héroes del Silencio albums
1991 live albums
EMI Records live albums